Gower is a constituency of the Senedd. It elects one Member of the Senedd by the first past the post method of election. It is also one of seven constituencies in the South Wales West electoral region, which elects four additional members, in addition to seven constituency members, to produce a degree of proportional representation for the region as a whole.

History

The constituency has elected a Labour member since the assembly was created in 1999. However in 2007 and 2016 the party won narrow majorities. The AM from 1999 to 2016 Edwina Hart was Minister for Business, Enterprise, Technology and Science from 2011 to 2016.

Boundaries

The constituency was created for the first election to the Assembly, in 1999, with the name and boundaries of the Gower Westminster constituency. It is entirely within the preserved county of West Glamorgan.

The other six constituencies of the region are Aberavon, Bridgend, Neath, Ogmore, Swansea East and Swansea West.

Voting
In general elections for the Senedd, each voter has two votes. The first vote may be used to vote for a candidate to become the Member of the Senedd for the voter's constituency, elected by the first past the post system. The second vote may be used to vote for a regional closed party list of candidates. Additional member seats are allocated from the lists by the d'Hondt method, with constituency results being taken into account in the allocation.

Members of the Senedd

Elections

Elections in the 2020s 

Regional Ballot void votes: 182. Want of an Official Mark (0), Voting for more than ONE party or individual candidate (48), Writing or mark by which the Voter could be identified (1), Unmarked or Void for uncertainty (133)

Elections in the 2010s

Regional ballots rejected: 188

Elections in the 2000s

2003 Electorate: 60,523
Regional ballots rejected: 335

Elections in the 1990s

Notes

References

Senedd constituencies in the South Wales West electoral region
Politics of Swansea
1999 establishments in Wales
Constituencies established in 1999